The 2010 SuperLiga was the fourth edition of the SuperLiga. The top four overall Major League Soccer teams from the 2009 season not already qualified for the 2010–11 CONCACAF Champions League earned qualification as well as four clubs from the Primera División de México.

Qualification 

The teams involved were selected based on qualification rules set by their respective leagues.

On April 28, 2010, MLS announced that for the 2010 season the top four teams from the 2009 MLS regular season standings not competing in the 2010–11 CONCACAF Champions League would qualify for SuperLiga 2010.

The Primera División de México announced its participants would be the top four team from the 2009 overall standings (Clausura 2009 and Apertura 2009) that were not competing in the 2010–11 CONCACAF Champions League. Furthermore, Club América (5th 2009 overall) declined to participate.

The SuperLiga 2010 participants are as follows:

From  Major League Soccer:

 Houston Dynamo (2009 3rd overall)
 Chicago Fire (2009 5th overall)
 Chivas USA (2009 6th overall)
 New England Revolution (2009 7th overall)

From  Primera División de México:

 Pachuca (2009 2nd overall)
 Morelia (2009 5th overall)
 Puebla (2009 6th overall)
 UNAM (2009 9th overall)

Group stage
There were two groups of four teams. Each group contained two clubs from each league with the top two teams from each groups advancing to the semifinals.

Group A

Group B

Knockout round

Bracket

Semi-finals

Final

Goalscorers
4 goals
 Miguel Sabah ( Morelia)
2 goals

 Joseph Ngwenya ( Houston)
 Nicolás Olivera ( Puebla)
 Mario Ortiz ( Puebla)
 Marko Perović ( New England)
 Luis Gabriel Rey ( Morelia)

1 goal

 Kevin Alston ( New England Revolution)
 Franco Arizala ( Pachuca)
 Leandro Augusto ( UNAM)
 Wiliam Conde ( Chicago Fire)
 Javier Cortés ( UNAM)
 Hugo Droguett ( Morelia)
 Álvaro Fabián González ( Puebla)
 Elías Hernández ( Morelia)
 Steven Kinney ( Chicago)
 Jaime Lozano ( Morelia)
 Rafael Márquez Lugo ( Morelia)
 Giancarlo Maldonado ( Chivas USA)
 Kenny Mansally ( New England)
 Damián Manso ( Pachuca)
 Dominic Oduro ( Houston Dynamo)
 Jesús Padilla ( Chivas USA)
 Lovel Palmer ( Houston Dynamo)
 Gabriel Pereyra ( Puebla)
 Zack Schilawski ( New England Revolution)
 Michael Umaña ( Chivas USA)

References

External links
 SuperLiga 2010 Official site

2010
2010–11 in Mexican football
2010 in American soccer